Seven ships of the Royal Navy have been named HMS Cornwall after the Duchy of Cornwall. Cornwall's motto is onen hag oll (- Cornish), unus et omnes (- Latin), one and all - English).

 was an 80-gun third-rate ship of the line launched in 1692 and broken up in 1761.
 was a 74-gun third-rate launched in 1761. She was damaged in action in 1780, and subsequently burnt as unserviceable.
 was a 74-gun third-rate launched in 1812. She was reduced to 50 guns in 1831, was renamed HMS Wellesley in 1869 and served as a school ship until broken up in 1874.
She was renamed HMS Cornwall in 1868 when she became a school ship, and was sunk in 1940.
 was a  armoured cruiser launched in 1902 and sold in 1920.
 was a  heavy cruiser launched in 1926 that a Japanese air attack sank during the Indian Ocean raid in 1942.
 was a Type 22 Batch 3 frigate launched in 1985 and decommissioned in June 2011.

Battle honours
Barfleur 1692
Falkland Islands 1914
Dardanelles 1915

See also
  - ships of the Jamaica Defence Force

References

Royal Navy ship names
Military of the United Kingdom in Cornwall